The parish of  Saint John (St. John) is a parish of Barbados on the eastern side of the island. It is home to one of its secondary schools, The Lodge School. It is home to the St. John's Parish Church, which has a scenic view of the Atlantic Ocean from its perch near Hackleton's Cliff, which overlooks the East Coast of the island. In its southeastern corner, the shoreline turns northward, forming the small Conset Bay.

Society Primary is the oldest primary school on the island. It is over 100 years old and was built by Codrington College.

Geography

Populated places

The center of Saint John is at Gall Hill and Glebe Land on Highway 3B. Gall Hill is the home of the Gall Hill Community Center and the Gall Hill Pavilion. There are shops and restaurants on main street. Glebe Land is the home of St. John's Primary School and the David Thompson Health and Social Services Complex. The Parish Church is a little north of Highway 3B.

Four Roads is the second center of St. John, also on Highway 3B, towards Bridgetown. There is a gas station, the post office, and the fire station at Four Roads.

Other primary schools are at Mount Tabor and St. Margaret`s. The secondary school, The Lodge School, is situated in the south, near Society at Highway H. St. John is the home of the Codrington College, one of the oldest Anglican theological colleges in the Americas.

The Center of tourism is Bath Beach.

The parish contains the following towns, villages, localities, settlements, communities, and hamlets:
 Ashford Plantation
 Bath
 Bowmanston
 Cherry Grove
 Church View
 Cliff Cottage
 Cliff Plantation
 Clifton Hall
 Coach Hill
 Conset Bay
 Eastmont
 Edge Cliff
 Edey Village
 Foster Hall
 Four Roads
 Gall Hill
 Glebe Land
 Glenburnie
 Guinea
 Haynes Hill
 Hill View
 Hothersal
 Kendal
 Kendal Plantation
 Lemon Arbour
 Malvern
 Massiah Street
 Moores
 Mount Pleasant
 Mount Tabor
 Newcastle
 Palmers
 Pool
 Pool Plantation
 Pothouse
 Quintyne
 Rosegate
 St Margarets
 St Marks
 Sargeant Street
 Sealy Hall
 Sherbourne
 Small Hope
 Small Town
 Society
 Society Plantation
 Spooners
 Stewart Hill
 Venture
 Wakefield Plantation
 Welchtown
 Wilson Hill

Parishes bordering Saint John
Saint George (west)
Saint Joseph (north)
Saint Philip (southeast)

Landmarks

Notable people
Sarah Kirnon, chef

References

External links 
 
 

 
Parishes of Barbados